Estonia competed at the 2014 Summer Youth Olympics, in Nanjing, China from 16 August to 28 August 2014.

Athletics

Estonia qualified five athletes.

Qualification Legend: Q=Final A (medal); qB=Final B (non-medal); qC=Final C (non-medal); qD=Final D (non-medal); qE=Final E (non-medal)

Boys
Field Events

Girls
Field events

Badminton

Estonia qualified one athlete based on the 2 May 2014 BWF Junior World Rankings.

Singles

Doubles

Basketball

Estonia qualified a girls' team from their performance at the 2013 U18 3x3 World Championships.

Skills Competition

Girls' Tournament

Roster
 Kadri-Ann Lass
 Tatjana Razguljajeva
 Marie Roosalu
 Kadri Uiga

Group Stage

Round of 16

Quarterfinals

Knockout Stage

Cycling

Estonia qualified a girls' team based on its ranking issued by the UCI.

Team

Judo

Estonia qualified one athlete based on its performance at the 2013 Cadet World Judo Championships.

Individual

Sailing

Estonia was given a reallocation boat based on being a top ranked nation not yet qualified.

Swimming

Estonia qualified three swimmers.

Boys

Girls

References

2014 in Estonian sport
Nations at the 2014 Summer Youth Olympics
Estonia at the Youth Olympics